Sidnaw is an unincorporated community in southern Houghton County, Michigan, United States.

History 
Sidnaw was founded by lumber companies harvesting white pine in the area. The community was first platted by Thomas Nester in 1889. Sidnaw had a station on the Duluth, South Shore and Atlantic Railway. A post office opened in Sidnaw on December 7, 1889; George Garland was the first postmaster. The community's name is derived from an American Indian word meaning "small hill by a creek".

In popular culture

Sidnaw appears in the 2000 film Reindeer Games, as it is the hometown of the main character, Rudy Duncan.

References

Unincorporated communities in Houghton County, Michigan
Unincorporated communities in Michigan
Houghton micropolitan area, Michigan